The 2022 European Tour, titled as the 2022 DP World Tour for sponsorship reasons, was the 51st season of golf tournaments since the European Tour officially began in 1972 and the first and only edition of the DP World Tour Rankings.

It was the first season of the tour under a title sponsorship agreement with DP World, that was announced in November 2021.

Changes for 2022
Many tournaments had been confirmed independently ahead of the official announcement in November 2021, when the majority of the tournaments were confirmed along with the DP World title sponsorship agreement. The schedule included the four major championships as usual; however the World Golf Championships were downgraded to just two events. The Rolex Series had risen to five events, seeing the inclusion of the Slync.io Dubai Desert Classic for the first time. 

As part of a new "strategic alliance" between the European Tour and PGA Tour, there were three regular tournaments co-sanctioned by the PGA Tour; these events were the Genesis Scottish Open, the Barbasol Championship and the Barracuda Championship. It was also confirmed that the "strategic alliance" would see an increased prize fund for the Horizon Irish Open, rising to US$6,000,000.

Other additions to the schedule included the Ras Al Khaimah Championship, the Ras Al Khaimah Classic, the MyGolfLife Open, the Steyn City Championship, the ISPS Handa Championship in Spain and the Catalunya Championship.

Response to LIV Golf
Following a statement produced by the European Tour on 24 June 2022, they confirmed that players who competed in the inaugural LIV Golf Invitational Series event in London would be fined £100,000 as well as being prohibited from competing in events co-sanctioned with the PGA Tour (which prohibits members from participating in the LIV series).  These events were the Genesis Scottish Open, the Barbasol Championship and the Barracuda Championship.

Schedule
The following table lists official events during the 2022 season.

Unofficial events
The following events were sanctioned by the European Tour, but did not carry official money, nor were wins official.

Location of tournaments

DP World Tour Rankings
Final top 10 players in the DP World Tour Rankings:

• Did not play

Awards

See also
2022 in golf
2022 Challenge Tour
2022 European Senior Tour
2022 Ladies European Tour
2021–22 PGA Tour
2022–23 PGA Tour

Notes

References

External links
Official site

2022
2022 in golf